Gabriel Calabres Nunes (born 8 March 1998) is a Brazilian footballer who plays as a midfielder for Cianorte.

Club career

São Carlos
Born in Matão, Calabres represented São Carlos as a youth. On 14 June 2015 he made his first team debut, coming on as a half-time substitute in a 3–1 Campeonato Paulista Segunda Divisão away win against Palmeirinha.

After featuring in eleven matches as his side was crowned champions, Calabres returned to the youth setup for the 2016 Copa São Paulo de Futebol Júnior, only returning to the main squad for the ensuing Copa Paulista.

Santos
On 12 November 2016, Calabres signed a three-year contract with Santos, returning to youth football. He also featured sparingly for the B-side in the following campaign, but returned to the under-20s in 2018 ahead of the year's Copa São Paulo de Juniores.

On 20 January 2018, Calabres was promoted to the first team by new manager Jair Ventura. He made his debut with the main squad on 11 March, replacing Guilherme Nunes in a 3–1 home loss against São Bento.

Calabres made his Série A debut on 8 August 2018, replacing Carlos Sánchez in a 1–1 away draw against Ceará. The following 15 April, after failing to appear under new manager Jorge Sampaoli, he rescinded his contract.

Cianorte / Chapecoense
On 18 April 2019, Calabres was announced at Cianorte for the Série D. On 25 July, after playing eight matches for the side, he moved to top tier side Chapecoense.

Botafogo-SP
On 27 December 2019, Calabres agreed to a deal with Botafogo-SP in the Série B.

Career statistics

Honours
São Carlos
Campeonato Paulista Segunda Divisão: 2015

References

External links
Santos FC profile  

1998 births
Living people
Footballers from São Paulo (state)
Brazilian footballers
Association football midfielders
Campeonato Brasileiro Série A players
Campeonato Brasileiro Série B players
Campeonato Brasileiro Série D players
São Carlos Futebol Clube players
Santos FC players
Cianorte Futebol Clube players
Associação Chapecoense de Futebol players
Botafogo Futebol Clube (SP) players
People from Matão